Sons of Korah may refer to

 Sons of Korah (Bible)
 Sons of Korah (band)

See also
 Sons of Korhal, a rebel group in the StarCraft franchise